Balestrini is an Italian surname. Notable people with the surname include:

Alberto Balestrini (born 1931), Argentine fencer
Alberto Balestrini (1947–2017), Argentine politician
Carlo Balestrini (1868–1922), Italian painter
Carlos Balestrini (1880–1972), Argentine sport shooter
Giulio Balestrini (1907–?), Italian footballer
Nanni Balestrini (born 1935), Italian poet

Italian-language surnames